Maple Hill may refer to:

Populated places
Maple Hill, Iowa
Maple Hill, Kansas
Maple Hill, North Carolina
Maple Hill, Ontario (disambiguation), Canada
Maple Hill, Wisconsin

Natural formations
Maple Hill (New Jersey)
Maple Hill (New York)

Other uses
Maple Hill Cemetery (disambiguation)
Maple Hill Pavilion

See also